Steve Rawlins is an American musician, composer, arranger, musical director, and author.  He has arranged music for a wide range of recording artists, including Smokey Robinson, Bette Midler, Chaka Khan, Anna Danes, and Lainie Kazan.  He produced the single Angelito (Angel Baby), recorded by Isela Sotelo on Motown Latino Records, which charted on Latin Billboard's Hot 100 in 1982.

He has arranged music for the Academy Awards and Emmy Award ceremonies, and for multiple television shows, including The Crazy Ones, 24, and Jeopardy!. Rawlins has performed throughout the U.S. and internationally including Carnegie Hall and the John F. Kennedy Center for the Performing Arts and served as music director for such artists as John O'Hurley, Lainie Kazan, Steve March-Tormé, Anna Danes, Shea Arender, and The Wonderful Wizard of Song-The Music of Harold Arlen.

Early life
Steve Rawlins (born September 5, 1954) was born in Mineola, New York to parents Gloria (née Gluck) and Herbert Rawitz. His father was an aerospace engineer that worked on NASA's Project Gemini. Rawlins is the second born of three siblings. He began taking piano lessons at six years old and began playing the trumpet at nine years old and played both instruments consistently throughout his childhood.

He and his family relocated to Los Angeles, California in 1965 when Rawlins was eleven years old.  His parents frequented live CBS variety television show tapings as a part of the audience and sat next to the orchestra which influenced Rawlins in choosing a career as a professional musician.  He attended University High School (Los Angeles) where the school's big band singer was Lorna Luft (daughter of Judy Garland) and Rawlins wrote some of his earliest arrangements for her to sing.  His music teacher John Magruder, (who played baritone saxophone with Don Ellis) mentored him in music arranging and career direction.  He graduated high school in 1972.

While attending CSUN, (California State University at Northridge) Rawlins saw a notice on a bulletin board that composer/arranger Sammy Nestico was teaching a big band and was looking for musicians at nearby Pierce College.
Rawlins joined the band for the next two years learning much from Nestico in advanced composition and orchestration techniques.

Career
In 1974 Rawlins played keyboards with a top 40 band touring throughout Western Canada. Upon returning to Los Angeles in 1975 he began writing music for The Merv Griffin Show and was offered a position as a staff arranger and music librarian. Griffin's featured trumpet player, Jack Sheldon, introduced Rawlins to Benny Goodman to write arrangements that were featured in his 40th Anniversary Concert at Carnegie Hall.

In 1979, Rawlins was hired by John Davidson (entertainer) as an arranger at his John Davidson's Singer's Summer Camp (JDSSC) on Catalina Island then hired him to write for his show in Las Vegas and Rawlins went on to compose and arrange music for his The John Davidson Show, which aired for two years.

He continued to freelance as a musician, composer and arranger for various commercials, TV shows, and recording projects.

Isela Sotelo - Angelito (Angel Baby) - Motown Latino Records
Rawlins produced and arranged Isela Sotelo's radio charting single, Angelito (Angel Baby) released on Motown Latino Records which was earned a spot on the Billboard Hot 100 Latin music charts in 1982.

Step Right Up
Before the release of his album Step Right Up (released on Sea Breeze Records) in 1985, Rawitz decided to legally change his last name to Rawlins for the sake of easier pronunciation and spelling.  The song, Laguna was played on radio stations throughout the U.S. and was in regular rotation on KTWV (94.7 The Wave) in Los Angeles in 1985.

Steve March-Tormé  
Rawlins began working with Steve March-Tormé in 1996 as an arranger, composer, and pianist and continues to work with him. Rawlins co-wrote the title track, Swingin' at the Blue Moon Bar & Grille as well as arranged Straighten Up and Fly Right which March-Tormé recorded as a duet with his father, Mel Tormé.

Discography

Film & Television

Author
In 1995 while attending the NAMM Show Rawlins met John Haag, who was the president of Creative Concepts Publishing. Haag published Rawlins' How To Get Real With A Fake Book 
Shortly there after Hal Leonard LLC bought out Creative Concepts Publishing and hired Haag as a consultant who oversaw the rest of Rawlins' Hal Leonard releases.

References

Living people
American jazz musicians
1954 births
People from Mineola, New York
American pianists
21st-century American pianists